A steel can, tin can, tin (especially in British English, Australian English, Canadian English and South African English), steel packaging, or can is a  container for the distribution or storage of goods, made of thin metal.  Many cans require opening by cutting the "end" open;  others have removable covers. They can store a broad variety of contents: food, beverages, oil, chemicals, etc.  Steel cans are made of tinplate (tin-coated steel) or of tin-free steel. In some dialects, even aluminium cans are called "tin cans".

Steel cans are highly recyclable, unlike materials like plastic, with around 65% of steel cans being recycled.

History
The tin canning process was conceived by the Frenchman Philippe de Girard, who got a British merchant Peter Durand to patent the idea in 1810.  The canning concept was based on experimental food preservation work in glass containers the year before by the French inventor Nicholas Appert. Durand did not pursue food canning, but, in 1812, sold his patent to two Englishmen, Bryan Donkin and John Hall, who refined the process and product, and set up the world's first commercial canning factory on Southwark Park Road, London.  By 1813 they were producing their first tin canned goods for the Royal Navy. By 1820, tin canisters or cans were being used for gunpowder, seeds, and turpentine.

Early tin cans were sealed by soldering with a tin–lead alloy, which could lead to lead poisoning.

In 1901 in the United States, the American Can Company was founded, at the time producing 90% of United States tin cans.

Canned food in tin cans was already quite popular in various countries when technological advancements in the 1920s lowered the cost of the cans even further. In 1935, the first beer in metal cans was sold; it was an instant sales success.

Description
Most cans are right circular cylinders with identical and parallel round tops and bottoms with vertical sides. However, cans for small volumes or particularly-shaped contents, the top and bottom may be rounded-corner rectangles or ovals. Other contents may suit a can that is somewhat conical in shape.

Fabrication of most cans results in at least one rim—a narrow ring slightly larger than the outside diameter of the rest of the can.  The flat surfaces of rimmed cans are recessed from the edge of any rim (toward the middle of the can) by about the width of the rim; the inside diameter of a rim, adjacent to this recessed surface, is slightly smaller than the inside diameter of the rest of the can.

Three-piece can construction results in top and bottom rims. In two-piece construction, one piece is a flat top and the other a deep-drawn cup-shaped piece that combines the (at least roughly) cylindrical wall and the round base. Transition between wall and base is usually gradual.  Such cans have a single rim at the top. Some cans have a separate cover that slides onto the top or is hinged.

Two piece steel cans can be made by "drawing" to form the bottom and sides and adding an "end" at the top:  these do not have side seams.  Cans can be fabricated with separate slip-on, or friction fit  covers and with covers attached by hinges.  Various easy opening methods are available.

In the mid-20th century, a few milk products were packaged in nearly rimless cans, reflecting different construction; in this case, one flat surface had a hole (for filling the nearly complete can) that was sealed after filling with a quickly solidifying drop of molten solder.  Concern arose that the milk contained unsafe levels of lead leached from this solder plug.

Advantages of steel cans
A number of factors make steel cans ideal containers for beverages. Steel cans are stronger than cartons or plastic, and less fragile than glass, protecting the product in transit and preventing leakage or spillage, while also reducing the need for secondary packaging.

Steel and aluminium packaging offer 100% barrier protection against light, water and air, and metal cans without resealable closures are among the most tamper-evident of all packaging materials. Steel cans preserve and protect the product from damage by light, oxidation, extremes of temperature and contamination, safeguarding flavour, appearance and quality from factory to final consumer. Food and drink packed in steel cans has equivalent vitamin content to freshly prepared, without needing preserving agents. Steel cans also extend the product's shelf-life, allowing longer sell-by and use-by dates and reducing waste.

As an ambient packaging medium, steel cans do not require cooling in the supply chain, simplifying logistics and storage, and saving energy and cost. At the same time, steel's relatively high thermal conductivity means canned drinks chill much more rapidly and easily than those in glass or plastic bottles.

A World Steel Association initiative, Choose Steel, is encouraging the use of steel for beverage cans.

Materials
No cans currently in wide use are composed primarily or wholly of tin; that term rather reflects the nearly exclusive use in cans, until the second half of the 20th century, of tinplate steel, which combined the physical strength and relatively low price of steel with the corrosion resistance of tin.  Depending on contents and available coatings, some canneries still use tin-free steel.

In some local dialects, any metal can, even aluminium, might be called a "tin can".  Use of aluminium in cans began in 1957. Aluminium is less costly than tin-plated steel but offers the same resistance to corrosion in addition to greater malleability, resulting in ease of manufacture; this gave rise to the two-piece can, where all but the top of the can is simply stamped out of a single piece of aluminium, rather than laboriously constructed from three pieces of steel.

A can traditionally has a printed paper or plastic label glued to the outside of the curved surface, indicating its contents. Some labels contain additional information, such as recipes, on the reverse side. More recently labels are sometimes printed directly onto the metal before or after the metal sheet is formed into the individual cans.

In November 1991, US can manufacturers voluntarily eliminated lead seams in food cans.  However, imported food cans continued to include lead soldered seams. In 1995, the US FDA issued a rule prohibiting lead soldered food cans, including both domestic and imported food cans.

In modern times, the majority of food cans in the UK have been lined with a plastic coating containing bisphenol A (BPA). The coating prevents acids and other substances from corroding the tin or aluminium of the can, but leaching of BPA into the can's contents was investigated as a potential health hazard.

Standard sizes

Cans come in a variety of shapes: two common ones are the "soup tin" and the "tuna tin".  Walls are often stiffened with rib bulges, especially on larger cans, to help the can resist dents that can cause seams to split.

Can sizes in the United States have an assortment of designations and sizes. For example, size 7/8 contains one serving of half a cup with an estimated weight of 4 ounces; size 1 "picnic" has two or three servings totalling one and a quarter cups with an estimated weight of 10 ounces; size 303 has four servings totalling 2 cups weighing 15 ounces; and size 10 cans, most widely used by food services selling to cafeterias and restaurants, have twenty-five servings totalling 13 cups with an estimated weight of 103 ounces (size of a roughly 3 pound coffee can). These are U.S. customary cups, not British Imperial standard.

In the United States, cook books sometimes reference cans by size. The Can Manufacturers Institute defines these sizes, expressing them in three-digit numbers, as measured in whole and sixteenths of an inch for the container's nominal outside dimensions: a 307 × 512 would thus measure 3 and 7/16" in diameter by 5 and 3/4" (12/16") in height. Older can numbers are often expressed as single digits, their contents being calculated for room-temperature water as approximately eleven ounces (#1 "picnic" can), twenty ounces (#2), thirty-two ounces (#3) fifty-eight ounces (#5) and one-hundred-ten ounces (#10 "coffee" can).

In parts of the world using the metric system, tins are made in 250, 500, 750 ml (millilitre) and 1 L (litre) sizes (250 ml is approximately 1 cup or 8 ounces).  Cans imported from the USA often have odd sizes such as 3.8 L (1 US gallon), 1.9 L (1/2 US gallon), and 946 ml (2 US pints / 1 quart).

In the UK and Australia, cans are usually measured by net weight. A standard size tin can holds roughly 400 g; though the weight can vary between 385 g and 425 g depending on the density of the contents. The smaller half sized can holds roughly 200 g, typically varying between 170 g and 225 g.

Fabrication of cans
Rimmed three-piece can construction involves several stages;
 Forming a tube and welding or soldering the seam of the sides
 Joining the bottom end to the tube
 Printing or attaching labels to the can
 Filling the can with content;  sterilization or retorting is required for many food products
 Joining the wall and top "end".

Double seam rims are crucial to the joining of the wall to a top or bottom surface. An extremely tight fit between the pieces must be accomplished to prevent leakage; the process of accomplishing this radically deforms the rims of the parts. Part of the tube that forms the wall is bent, almost at its end, turning outward through 90 degrees, and then bent further, toward the middle of the tube, until it is parallel to the rest of the tube, a total bend of 180 degrees.

The outer edge of the flat piece is bent against this toward the middle of the tubular wall, until parallel with the wall, turning inward through 90 degrees.  The edge of bent portion is bent further through another 90 degrees, inward now toward the axis of the tube and parallel to the main portion of the flat piece, making a total bend of 180 degrees. It is bent far enough inward that its circular edge is now slightly smaller in diameter than the edge of the tube. Bending it yet further, until it is parallel with the tube's axis, gives it a total bend of 270 degrees. It now envelops the outward rim of the tube.

Looking outward from the axis of the tube, the first surface is the unbent portion of the tube. Slightly further out is a narrow portion of the top, including its edge. The outward-bent portion of the tube, including its edge, is still slightly further out. Furthest out is the 90-degree-bent portion of the flat surface.

The combined interacting forces, as the portion of the flat surface adjacent to the interior of the tube is indented toward the middle of the tube and then outward forward the axis of the tube, and the other bent portions of the flat piece and the tube are all forced toward the axis of the tube, drives these five thicknesses of metal against each other from inside and out, forming a "dry" joint so tight that welding or solder is not needed to strengthen or seal it.  Illustrations of this process can be found on pages 20–22 of the FAO Fisheries Technical Paper 285 "Manual on fish canning" located here.

Design and manufacture

Steel for can making
The majority of steel used in packaging is tinplate, which is steel that has been coated with a thin layer of tin, whose functionality is required for the production process. The tin layer is usually applied by electroplating.

Two-piece steel can design
Most steel beverage cans are two-piece designs, made from 1) a disc re-formed into a cylinder with an integral end, double-seamed after filling and 2) a loose end to close it. Steel cans are made in many different diameters and volumes, with opening mechanisms that vary from ring pulls and tab openers, to wide open mouths. Modern can making lines may produce up to 1000 cans per minute.

Drawn-and-ironed (DWI) steel cans
The process of re-forming sheet metal without changing its thickness is known as 'drawing'. Thinning the walls of a two-piece can by passing it through circular dies is called 'ironing'. Steel beverage cans are therefore generally referred to as drawn-and-ironed, or DWI, cans (sometimes D&I). The DWI process is used for making cans where the height is greater than the diameter, and is particularly suited to making large volumes of cans of the same basic specification.

Steel can wall thicknesses are now 30% thinner and weigh 40% less than 30 years ago, reducing the amounts of raw materials and energy required to make them. They are also up to 40% thinner than aluminium.

Magnetic properties
Steel is a ferrous metal and is therefore magnetic. For beverage packaging this is unique. This allows the use of magnetic conveyor systems to transfer empty cans through the filling and packing processes, increasing accuracy and reducing potential spillage and waste. In recycling facilities, steel cans may be readily separated from other waste using magnetic equipment including cross-belt separators, also known as overband magnets, and drum magnets.

Opening cans
The first cans were heavy-weight containers that required ingenuity to open, with implements such as knives. Not until several years  later, after can manufacturers started using thinner metal sheets, were any dedicated can openers developed.

While beverage cans or cans of fluid such as broth can merely be punctured to remove the product, solid or semisolid contents require removing one end of the can. This can be accomplished with a heavy knife or other sharp tool—but can openers are much more convenient.

Some cans, such as those used for sardines, have a specially scored lid so that the user can break out the metal by the leverage of winding it around a slotted church key. Until the mid-20th century, some sardine tins had solder-attached lids, and the winding key worked by forcing the solder joint apart.

The advent of pull tabs in beverage cans spread to the canning of various food products, such as pet food or nuts (and non-food products such as motor oil and tennis balls). The ends are known as easy open lids because they open without any tools or implements. An additional innovation developed for specifically for food cans uses a tab that is bent slightly upwards, creating a larger surface area for easier finger access.

Cans can be made with easy open features. Some cans have screw caps for pouring liquids and resealing.  Some have hinged covers or slip-on covers for easy access. Paint cans often have a removable plug on the top for access and for reclosing.

Recycling and re-use
Steel from cans and other sources is the most recycled packaging material. Around 65% of steel cans are recycled. In the United States, 63% of steel cans are recycled, compared to 52% of aluminium cans. In Europe, the recycling rate in 2016 is 79.5%.
Most can recycling occurs at the smelters, but individual consumers also directly reuse cans in various ways. For instance some people use two tin cans to form a camp or survival stove to cook small meals.

Sustainability and recycling of steel beverage cans

Steel recycling
From an ecological perspective, steel may be regarded as a closed-loop material: post-consumer waste can be collected, recycled and used to make new cans or other products. Each tonne of scrap steel recycled saves 1.5 tonnes of CO2, 1.4 tonnes of iron ore and 740 kg of coal. Steel is the world's most recycled material, with more than 85% of all the world's steel products being recycled at the end of their life: an estimated 630 million tonnes of steel scrap were recycled in 2017, saving 945 million tonnes of CO2.

Steel can recycling
A steel can can be recycled again and again without loss of quality, however for the food grade steel it's required to remove tin from the scrap metal, which is done by way of electrochemistry: the tin is leached from a high pH solution at low negative voltage. 

Recycling a single can saves the equivalent power for one laundry load, 1 hour of TV or 24 hours of lighting (10W LED bulb).

Steel beverage cans are recycled by being melted down in an electric arc furnace or basic oxygen furnace.

Most steel cans also carry some form of recycling identification such as the Metal Recycles Forever Mark  Recyclable Steel  and the Choose Steel campaign logo. There is also a campaign in Europe called Every Can Counts, encouraging can recycling in the workplace

Smaller carbon footprint
All beverage packaging creates CO2 emissions at every stage in the production process, from raw material extraction, processing and manufacture through to recycling. However, steel cans are an ecological top performer, as cans can always be recycled. The steel industry needs the used cans and will use them in the production of new steel product. By recycling the cans and closing the loop, CO2 emissions are dramatically reduced. There is also the potential for higher global steel recycling rates as consumers become more aware of the benefits.

Health issues

Dissolution of tin into the food
Tin is corrosion resistant, but acidic food like fruits and vegetables can corrode the tin layer. Nausea, vomiting, and diarrhea have been reported after ingesting canned food containing 200 mg/kg of tin. A 2002 study showed that 99.5% of 1200 tested cans contained below the UK regulatory limit of 200 mg/kg of tin, an improvement over most previous studies largely attributed to the increased use of fully lacquered cans for acidic foods, and concluded that the results do not raise any long term food safety concerns for consumers. The two non-compliant products were voluntarily recalled.

Evidence of tin impurities can be indicated by color, as in the case of pears, but lack of color change does not guarantee that a food is not tainted with tin.

Bisphenol-A

Bisphenol-A (BPA) is a controversial chemical compound present in commercially available tin can plastic linings and transferred to canned food. The inside of the can is coated with an epoxy coating, in an attempt to prevent food or beverage from coming into contact with the metal. The longer food is in a can, and the warmer and more acidic it is, the more BPA leaches into it. In September 2010, Canada became the first country to declare BPA a toxic substance. In the European Union and Canada, BPA use is banned in baby bottles.
The FDA does not regulate BPA (see BPA controversy#Public health regulatory history in the United States).  Several companies, like Campbell's Soup, announced plans to eliminate BPA from the linings of their cans, but have not said which chemical they plan to replace it with. (See BPA controversy#Chemical manufacturers reactions to bans.)

See also

 Albion metal
 Drink can
 Oil can
 Tin box
 Tin can wall

References

General references, further reading
 Nicolas Appert
 Guide to Tinplate
 History of the Tin Can on About.com
 Yam, K. L., Encyclopedia of Packaging Technology, John Wiley & Sons, 2009, 
 Soroka, W, Fundamentals of Packaging Technology, Institute of Packaging Professionals (IoPP), 2002,

External links

Steeluniversity Packaging Module
Steel industry fact sheet on food cans
Standard U.S. can sizes at GourmetSleuth

Containers
Packaging
Food storage containers
British inventions
1810 introductions
Food packaging
Steel
19th-century inventions
Metallic objects